was a journal of history and current affairs founded by Martin Meyer, who wrote under the name Philemerus Irenicus Elisius. It was published between 1659 and 1683 in 45 volumes, and later renamed . Wilhelm Serlin served as publisher from the journal's inception until Serlin's death. 

The journal focussed on contemporary events as opposed to chronicles of more distant times.  Burke cites the Diarium as an example of the existence of the concept of 'Europe' in the 17th century.

Notes

Sources

External links 
 Diarium Europaeum. Complete text of the journal at Europeana.

Publications established in the 1650s
Historiography of Germany
1659 establishments in Europe